Eddy Current is a twelve issues comic-book series created in 1987 by Ted McKeever and published by Mad Dog Graphics.

This and Transit were later tied into McKeever's Metropol world.

Publication
 Eddy Current (12-issue limited series, Mad Dog Graphics 1987–1988, trade paperback, hardcover, Dark Horse Comics, 1991)
 Eddy Current (3 part re-issue, Atomeka Press, 2005)

External links
 Dark Horse profile of the collected hardcover

References

1987 comics debuts
Dark Horse Comics titles
Comic book limited series